Esporte Clube São Bento, commonly referred to as São Bento, is a Brazilian professional association football club based in Sorocaba, São Paulo. They currently compete in the Série D, the fourth tier of the Brazilian football league system, as well as in Campeonato Paulista, the top tier of the São Paulo state football league.

History
On 14 September 1913, shortly after a yellow fever epidemic in Sorocaba, the club was founded as Sorocaba Athletic Club by Ferreira e Cia. horse tack factory employees. On 14 October 1914, the club was renamed to Esporte Clube São Bento. The club 's new name honors Saint Benedict, because São Bento's first games were played at the city's Saint Benedict's monastery.

In 1953, São Bento professionalized its football section. On 10 June 1953, the club played its first professional match (Campeonato Paulista Second Level), against Ferroviária of Botucatu. São Bento won 4-2.

In 1962, the club won its first title, the Campeonato Paulista Second Level, beating América (SP) in the final.

In 1979, São Bento competed in the Campeonato Brasileiro Série A. The club was eliminated in the third stage, finishing in the 15th place.

In 2001, the club won its second title, the Campeonato Paulista Third Level, finishing four points ahead of Atlético Sorocaba. In 2002, São Bento won its third title, the Copa FPF, beating Jaboticabal in the final.

São Bento reached the Semifinals in the 2016 Campeonato Brasileiro Série D, but it was eliminated by CSA, in the first leg CSA won 2-0 and in the second leg São Bento beat its opponent 1-0.

Current squad

Titles
 Copa FPF:
 Winners (2): 1985, 2002
 Campeonato Paulista Série A2:
 Winners (1): 1962
 Campeonato Paulista Série A3:
 Winners (1): 2001, 2013

Stadium

São Bento's home stadium is Estádio Municipal Walter Ribeiro, inaugurated in 1978, with a maximum capacity of 12,525 people.

Another stadium, named Estádio Humberto Reale is owned by the club, and has a maximum capacity of 20,000 people.

The club also trains at a training ground named Centro de Treinamento Humberto Reale.

Club colours
São Bento's colours are blue and white. The club's home kit is composed of a blue shirt, white short and blue socks.

Mascot
The club's mascot is a blue bird named Azulão wearing São Bento's home kit and carrying a bludgeon.

Nickname
The club is nicknamed Azulão, meaning Big Blue, and Bentão, meaning Big Bento or Big Benedict.

Ultra groups
 Torcida Uniformizada Falcão Azul
 Torcida Uniformizada Sangue Azul
 Torcida Uniformizada Tira Prosa

References

External links
 São Bento's unofficial website
 Azulão.net
 São Bento's unofficial blog¹
 São Bento's unofficial blog²

 
Association football clubs established in 1913
Football clubs in São Paulo (state)
1913 establishments in Brazil
Sorocaba